Thomas Edward Pugh (born 27 September 2000) is a professional footballer who plays as a midfielder for National League club Scunthorpe United.

Club career
Born in Doncaster, Pugh made his first-team debut for Scunthorpe United as an 86th-minute substitute for Clayton Lewis in a 3–2 defeat at Mansfield Town in the EFL Trophy on 13 November 2018. He made his first appearance at Glanford Park in the same competition on 12 November 2019, coming on as an 89-minute substitute for Matty Lund in a 3–0 win over Sunderland.

In May 2021, Pugh signed a new one-year contract with Scunthorpe.

On 8 February 2022, Pugh picked up a knee injury in a win against Walsall which ruled him out for the rest of the 2021–22 season.

At the end of the 2021–22 season, Pugh was released by Scunthorpe.

On 8 September 2022, Pugh signed for National League North club Scarborough Athletic on a non-contract basis. On 22 September 2022, having featured twice for Scarborough Athletic, Pugh returned to former club Scunthorpe United.

International career
Pugh was called up by Rob Page for the Wales under-21 team in May 2019, having been eligible due to his Welsh father. He scored on his debut after coming on as a 60th-minute substitute in what finished as a 2–1 defeat to Albania.

Career statistics

References

2000 births
Living people
Footballers from Doncaster
English footballers
English people of Welsh descent
Welsh footballers
Wales under-21 international footballers
Association football midfielders
Scunthorpe United F.C. players
Scarborough Athletic F.C. players
English Football League players
National League (English football) players